Antonio García Birlán (Fuente Vaqueros, (Granada), 1891 - Barcelona, 1984) was an Andalusian anarchist based in Catalonia.

Biography
Antonio García Birlán began work as a journalist and used the pseudonym Dionysus. He was a member of the National Committee of CNT in 1927-1929 and also of the FAI. He was part of the Solidarity group (led by Ángel Pestaña), formed as a trend within the CNT. He directed and collaborated on Mañana (1930), Tierra y Libertad, Acción (1930-1931) and was editor of Solidaridad Obrera.

He was Minister of Public Health and Social Assistance of the Generalitat de Catalunya from September 26 to December 17, 1936, and a member of the Consell d'Economia de Catalunya as a representative of the FAI (1936-1938). During the Spanish Civil War he directed La Vanguardia. After the conflict he went into exile in Argentina. He returned to Barcelona in 1983, but died a year later.

Works

References 

1891 births
1984 deaths
People from Andalusia
Spanish anarchists
Health ministers of Catalonia
People from the Province of Granada